Sognefjellet is a mountainous area and mountain pass which connects Lustrafjorden and its surrounding valley with the Ottadalen valley in the Jotunheimen area. Sognefjellet is located in Luster Municipality (in Vestland county) and Lom Municipality (in Innlandet county) in Norway. Sognefjellsvegen, part of County Road 55, runs through the mountains and over the pass.

References

Luster, Norway
Lom, Norway
Landforms of Innlandet
Landforms of Vestland
Mountain passes of Norway